Hala is a village in southern Syria, administratively part of the Rif Dimashq Governorate, located northeast of Damascus in the Qalamoun Mountains. Nearby localities include Ma'loula and Yabroud to the northeast, Hosh Arab, Rankous and Assal al-Ward to the northeast and Jayroud and al-Qutayfah to the east. According to the Syria Central Bureau of Statistics, Hala had a population of 3,921 in the 2004 census.

References

Populated places in Al-Qutayfah District